Keith Gill is the commissioner of the Sun Belt Conference, a collegiate athletic conference in the United States. As such, Gill is also the first African-American to serve as a commissioner of any FBS conference in NCAA history.

Gill previously served as athletic director at the University of Richmond from 2012 to 2017, as athletic director at American University from 2007 to 2012, and as senior associate athletic director at the University of Oklahoma from 2004 to 2007. Gill attended college at Duke University, where he played running back on the Duke Blue Devils football team. Gill was named the commissioner of the Sun Belt Conference on March 18, 2019. Gill has also worked many other collegiate jobs, such as working as the NCAA membership services representative from 1995 to 1999 and again from 2004 to 2007 as the director of membership services, assistant athletic director for Vanderbilt from 2000 to 2004, and as executive associate commissioner for the Atlantic 10 Conference from 2017 to 2019.

References

External links
American Eagles bio

Living people
African-American college athletic directors in the United States
African-American players of American football
American Eagles athletic directors
American football running backs
Duke Blue Devils football players
Duke University alumni
Richmond Spiders athletic directors
Sun Belt Conference commissioners
Year of birth missing (living people)
21st-century African-American people